The House on Krste Misirkov St. no. 6 is a house in the suburb of Novo Selo, Štip, North Macedonia. The house is registered as a Cultural Heritage of North Macedonia.

Gallery

See also
 House on Krste Misirkov St. no. 8, Štip - a cultural heritage site
 House on Krste Misirkov St. no. 45, Štip - a cultural heritage site
 Dormition of the Theotokos Church - the seat of Novo Selo Parish and a cultural heritage site
 Novo Selo School - the building of the former school and the present seat of the Rectorate of the Goce Delčev University. It is also a cultural heritage site
 Saint John the Baptist Church - a cultural heritage site
 Ascension of Christ Church - a cultural heritage site

References

External links
 Protected Cultural Heritage Project
 Institute and Museum - Štip

Buildings and structures in Štip
Cultural heritage of North Macedonia